The Closing Ceremony of the 2011 Pan American Games took place on October 30, 2011, beginning at 6:00 pm CST (00:30 UTC, October 31) at Omnilife Stadium in Guadalajara, Jalisco, Mexico. 

The closing ceremony was originally scheduled to be held at Jalisco Stadium. However, the organizing committee for the Games (COPAG) changed the venue to Omnilife Stadium, because of its superior infrastructure and technological capability to host the event. Also, its proximity to the athletes village helped expedite the transportation of athletes and helped ensure their safety. 

As per tradition, the Pan American Sports Organization flag was presented to the mayor of the next host city, Rob Ford of Toronto.

Puerto Rican singer Ricky Martin and The Wailers performed at the ceremony.

Dignitaries and other officials in attendance
 David Johnston, Governor General of Canada
 Bal Gosal, Canadian Minister of Sport
 Charles Sousa, Ontario Minister of Labour and minister responsible for the 2015 Pan and Parapan Games
 Rob Ford, Mayor of Toronto

National anthems
 Ely Guerra, national anthem of Mexico
 Florence K, national anthem of Canada

References

Ceremony Closing
Pan American Games closing ceremonies
Ceremonies in Mexico